Erwin Extercatte (born 16 April 1981 in Delden, Overijssel) is a Dutch former darts player who competed for the Professional Darts Corporation.

Career

Extercatte showed great promise in his first two years in the PDC, winning the Open Oust Nederland in 2004, followed by the 2005 Open Holland. He made his televised debut when he played at the 2006 PDC World Darts Championship, defeating Darren Webster in the first round but lost in the second round to Gary Welding. Extercatte got through to the 2008 PDC World Darts Championship. Starting at the Preliminary Round, he defeated Alan Bolton of New Zealand 5-0 before beating Colin Osborne in the first round. He lost in the second round to Barrie Bates.

World Championship Results

PDC

2006: 2nd Round (lost to Gary Welding 1-4)
2008: 2nd Round (lost to Barrie Bates 3-4)

External links
Erwin Extercatte's Website
Profile and stats on Darts Database

1981 births
Living people
People from Hof van Twente
Dutch darts players
Professional Darts Corporation former pro tour players
Sportspeople from Overijssel
21st-century Dutch people